Boone County is a county in the U.S. state of West Virginia. As of the 2020 census, the population was 21,809. Its county seat is Madison. Boone County is part of the Charleston, WV Metropolitan Statistical Area. Leading industries and chief agricultural products in Boone County include coal, lumber, natural gas, tobacco, and strawberries.

History
The county was formed in 1847 with territories annexed from Kanawha, Cabell, and Logan counties. It was named for frontiersman Daniel Boone, who lived in the Great Kanawha Valley from 1789 until 1795.

In 1863, West Virginia's counties were divided into civil townships, with the intention of encouraging local government.  This proved impractical in the heavily rural state, and in 1872 the townships were converted into magisterial districts.  Boone County was divided into five districts: Crook, Peytona, Scott, Sherman, and Washington.  Between 1980 and 1990, the county was redivided into three magisterial districts: District 1, District 2, and District 3.

On February 1, 2006, two fatal mining accidents occurred in the communities of Uneeda and Wharton in Boone County. These two deaths with the addition of January's Sago Mine disaster and the Aracoma Alma Mine disaster caused West Virginia Governor Joe Manchin to close all of West Virginia's mines in a "mine safety stand-down."

Geography
Boone County lies in the central southwestern part of West Virginia. Its terrain consists of low wooded mountains, carved with drainages. The terrain slopes to the north and west, with its highest point at its south corner, at 3,212' (979m) ASL.

Major highways

  U.S. Highway 119
  West Virginia Route 3
  West Virginia Route 17
  West Virginia Route 85
  West Virginia Route 94
  West Virginia Route 99

Adjacent counties

 Kanawha County - northeast
 Raleigh County - east
 Wyoming County - south
 Logan County - west
 Lincoln County - northwest

Demographics

2010 census
As of the census of 2010, there were 24,629 people, 9,928 households, and 7,014 families in the county. The population density was 49.1/sqmi (18.9/km2). There were 11,070 housing units at an average density of 22.1/sqmi (8.51/km2). The racial makeup of the county was 98.5% white, 0.5% black or African American, 0.1% Asian, 0.1% American Indian, 0.2% from other races, and 0.6% from two or more races. Those of Hispanic or Latino origin made up 0.4% of the population. In terms of ancestry, 15.4% were German, 13.3% were American, 12.9% were Irish, and 8.3% were English.

Of the 9,928 households, 32.2% had children under the age of 18 living with them, 54.0% were married couples living together, 11.3% had a female householder with no husband present, 29.4% were non-families, and 25.7% of all households were made up of individuals. The average household size was 2.47 and the average family size was 2.94. The median age was 40.7 years.

The median income for a household in the county was $39,783 and the median income for a family was $47,981. Males had a median income of $51,740 versus $32,110 for females. The per capita income for the county was $20,457. About 15.6% of families and 19.3% of the population were below the poverty line, including 25.9% of those under age 18 and 13.4% of those age 65 or over.

2000 census
As of the census of 2000, there were 25,535 people, 10,291 households, and 7,460 families in the county. The population density was 50.9/sqmi (19.6/km2). There were 11,575 housing units at an average density of 23.1/sqmi (8.9/km2). The racial makeup of the county was 98.53% White, 0.65% Black or African American, 0.12% Native American, 0.07% Asian, 0.02% Pacific Islander, 0.07% from other races, and 0.54% from two or more races. 0.46% of the population were Hispanic or Latino of any race.

The largest ancestry groups in Boone County are English (13%), Irish (12%) and German (11%).

There were 10,291 households, out of which 31.10% had children under the age of 18 living with them, 57.50% were married couples living together, 10.50% had a female householder with no husband present, and 27.50% were non-families. 24.60% of all households were made up of individuals, and 11.00% had someone living alone who was 65 years of age or older. The average household size was 2.47 and the average family size was 2.92.

The county contained 23.20% under the age of 18, 9.00% from 18 to 24, 28.00% from 25 to 44, 26.30% from 45 to 64, and 13.60% who were 65 years of age or older. The median age was 39 years. For every 100 females, there were 95.50 males. For every 100 females age 18 and over, there were 92.50 males.

The median income for a household in the county was $25,669, and the median income for a family was $31,999. Males had a median income of $34,931 versus $19,607 for females. The per capita income for the county was $14,453. About 18.30% of families and 22.00% of the population were below the poverty line, including 27.90% of those under age 18 and 13.90% of those age 65 or over.

Politics
With the exception of the 1972 Nixon landslide, Boone County voted Democratic in every presidential election from 1924 until 2012. In 2012, Republican Mitt Romney won over sixty percent of the vote in the process of becoming the first presidential candidate to sweep every county in the state. Also in 2012, in the state's Democratic primaries, Boone County was one of the West Virginia counties that voted for eccentric perennial candidate Keith Russell Judd, who at the time was still in prison on felony charges, over incumbent president Barack Obama.

Education

Madison
 Brookview Elementary School
 Madison Elementary School
 Ramage Elementary School
 Madison Middle School
 Scott High School

Van
 Van Elementary School
 Van Jr./Sr. High School

Seth
 Ashford-Rumble Elementary School 
 Sherman Elementary School
 Whitesville Elementary School
 Sherman Junior High School
 Sherman Senior High School

Communities

City
 Madison (county seat)

Towns
 Danville
 Sylvester
 Whitesville

Magisterial districts
 District 1
 District 2
 District 3

Census-designated places

 Comfort
 Greenview
 Racine
 Twilight
 Van

Unincorporated communities

 Andrew
 Ashford
 Bald Knob
 Bandytown
 Barrett
 Bigson
 Bim
 Bloomingrose
 Blue Pennant
 Bob White
 Bradley
 Brushton
 Cameo
 Cazy
 Clinton
 Clothier
 Coopertown
 Dartmont
 Drawdy
 Easly
 Eden
 Elk Run Junction
 Emmons (part)
 Foch
 Foster
 Fosterville
 Garrison
 Gordon
 Grippe
 Havana
 Hewett
 Hopkins Fork
 Janie
 Jeffrey
 Julian
 Keith
 Kirbyton
 Kohlsaat
 Lanta
 Lick Creek
 Lindytown
 Low Gap
 Manila
 Marnie
 Marthatown
 Maxine
 Milltown
 Morrisvale
 Nellis
 Nelson
 Onego
 Orgas
 Ottawa
 Peytona
 Pondco
 Powell Creek
 Prenter
 Price Hill
 Quinland
 Ramage
 Ridgeview
 Rumble
 Secoal
 Seth
 Sharlow
 South Madison
 Turtle Creek
 Uneeda
 Washington Heights
 West Junction
 Wharton
 Williams Mountain

Notable people
 Hasil Adkins, musician
 Billy Edd Wheeler, songwriter
 D. Ray White, mountain dancer, father of Jesco White
 Jesco White, "the Dancing Outlaw," mountain dancer, son of D. Ray White

See also
 Hobet Coal Mine
 Fork Creek Wildlife Management Area
 The Wild and Wonderful Whites of West Virginia, a documentary film set in Boone County
 National Register of Historic Places listings in Boone County, West Virginia
 Upper Big Branch Miners Memorial, a roadside memorial in Whitesville to honor the 29 men killed in an explosion at the Upper Big Branch Coal Mine on April 5, 2010.

References

External links
 Boone County Community and Economic Development Office
 WVGenWeb Boone County

 
1847 establishments in Virginia
Populated places established in 1847
Charleston, West Virginia metropolitan area
Counties of Appalachia